Herbert Schwartz was an American football player and coach of football, basketball, and baseball. He served as the head football coach at the First District Agricultural and Mechanical College—now known as Arkansas State University—from 1925 to 1930, compiling a record of 19–20–7. Schwartz was also the head basketball coach at First District A&M from 1926 to 1931 and again during the 1941–42 season, amassing a record of 38–72, and the school's head baseball coach from 1925 to 1929, tallying a mark of 27–33–2.

Head coaching record

Football

References

Year of birth missing
Year of death missing
Arkansas State Red Wolves baseball coaches
Arkansas State Red Wolves football coaches
Arkansas State Red Wolves football players
Arkansas State Red Wolves men's basketball coaches